Dale West (born 1941) is a former award winning and Grey Cup champion defensive back who played in the Canadian Football League for the Saskatchewan Roughriders from 1962 to 1968.

A graduate of the University of Regina (after attending the University of Arizona and the University of Saskatchewan on a football scholarship) West joined his hometown Green Riders for a 7 season career. Primarily a defensive back, he could punt, kick, return punts and kicks, rush and catch; 6 of his 18 pass receptions went for TDs. As a defender he won 3 all-star selections, intercepting 17 passes. 10 of those came in 1963, when he was selected as runner up for the CFL's Most Outstanding Canadian Award. Finally, West was a member of the Riders famed 1966 squad, which won Saskatchewan's first Grey Cup championship (he made a key interception to set up their first TD.)

After his playing days West became a Roughriders Plaza of Honor inductee (1997) and lives in Regina, where he was program co-coordinator with the Saskatchewan Sports Hall of Fame and Museum and then served three terms as a trustee for the Regina School Division #4.

References

1941 births
Living people
Sportspeople from Saskatoon
Players of Canadian football from Saskatchewan
Saskatchewan Huskies football players
Saskatchewan Roughriders players